The Vermont Wild was a team in the Federal Hockey League in the 2011-12 season.  Based in Morrisville, Vermont, the team — originally dubbed the Green Mountain Rock Crushers — played their home games at the Green Mountain Arena. Both the team and the arena were owned by Randall J. Latona, a former owner of the Rochester Americans of the American Hockey League and the Rochester Knighthawks of the National Lacrosse League. The Wild was the only professional ice hockey team ever to be based in the state of Vermont.

On November 25, 2011, after playing only 10 of their 53 scheduled games, the Federal Hockey League announced that the Vermont Wild had folded.

Season-by-season record
Federal Hockey League

External links
Vermont Wild website
Federal Hockey League website

References

Federal Prospects Hockey League teams
Ice hockey teams in Vermont
Ice hockey clubs established in 2011
Defunct sports teams in Vermont
2011 establishments in Vermont
Sports clubs disestablished in 2011
2011 disestablishments in Vermont